Arborfield Garrison was a British Army garrison, now the site of Arborfield Green, a new village approximately  south east of the village of Arborfield Cross in the English county of Berkshire. The army vacated the site in 2015 and it is now being redeveloped for housing, with a total of 3,500 homes planned. The Garrison and its associated housing estates are split between the civil parishes of Arborfield and Newland and Barkham. Both parishes are within the unitary authority of Wokingham. According to the Post Office the majority of the 2011 Census population was included in the civil parish of Barkham.

History
The garrison, which was initially operated by the Army Remount Service and supplied the military with horses for both operational and ceremonial purposes, was established as the Remount Depot in 1904. The depot operated throughout the First World War and most of the inter-war period before closing in 1937. During the Second World War, part of the garrison functioned as the Army Technical School and the rest of the garrison was occupied by Royal Artillery units which moved out just prior to D-Day in June 1944.

After the war the south-west part of the garrison, known as Poperinghe Barracks, became the depot of the Royal Electrical and Mechanical Engineers ('REME'). The barracks consisted of wooden huts mostly grouped in 'spiders', each spider being made up of six huts joined by corridors to central washing and utility rooms. After the Army Apprentices College at Hadrian's Camp closed in 1969, all REME apprentice training was concentrated at Arborfield. The School of Electronic Engineering ('SEE'), which was responsible for the training of aircraft and avionic technicians, also moved to Arborfield in 1995. The SAA became the Defence College of Aeronautical Engineering ('DCAE') in April 2004 and was renamed the School of Army Aeronautical Engineering ('SAAE') in 2013.

In July 2011 the then Defence Secretary, Dr Liam Fox, announced that RAF Lyneham would be the new site of the Defence Technical Training Change Programme (DTTCP) centre. This would coincide with the closures of Arborfield Garrison and the School of Electrical and Mechanical Engineering (SEME) at Bordon, with all posts at both bases moving to Lyneham in 2015. In 2016 planning permission was given to demolish many of the buildings and build a housing estate. The development will include 3,500 houses, retail units and a secondary school.

Reading F.C.
In 2004, Reading F.C. moved their training facilities to Hogwood Park, located within the garrison.

See also
 Units of the Royal Electrical and Mechanical Engineers

References

External links

Article on Princess Marina College, Arborfield
Arborfield Old Boys' Association

Installations of the British Army
Villages in Berkshire
Borough of Wokingham
Royal Electrical and Mechanical Engineers
British Army Garrisons